Paraleptophlebia guttata is a species of pronggilled mayfly in the family Leptophlebiidae. It is found in southeastern, northern Canada, and the eastern United States.

References

External links

 

Mayflies
Articles created by Qbugbot
Insects described in 1924